Amir Celestin (born July 18, 1990) is an American professional basketball player who currently plays for Maccabi Haifa of the Israeli Basketball Premier League. He played college basketball for Campbell University in NCAA Division Iwhere he starred in his four seasons with the Campbell Fighting Camels.

Professional career
After leaving Campbell University in 2012 Amir became an unrestricted free agent.

Maccabi Haifa
Amir Celestin competed for his hometown minor league team the Miami Midnites, based in Miami, Florida. Established in 2014, the club is an affiliate of Maccabi Haifa B.C. of the Israeli Basketball Premier League, The team is owned by Jeffrey Rosen, CEO of Triangle Entertainment.

On August 25, 2015,Amir  signed a 3-year deal with Maccabi Haifa of the Israeli Basketball Premier League.

References

1990 births
Living people
American expatriate basketball people in Israel
American men's basketball players
Basketball players from Miami
Campbell Fighting Camels basketball players
Maccabi Haifa B.C. players
Guards (basketball)
Miami Norland Senior High School alumni